WAZA (107.7 FM, "The Touch") is an American radio station licensed to serve the community of Liberty, Mississippi. The station is owned and operated by North Shore Broadcasting Co., Inc.

Programming
WAZA was launched as an urban outlet branded as "The Spot 107.7" in 1998. In mid-2010, the station flipped to sports talk as a Fox Sports Radio affiliate branded as "Sportstalk 107.7FM". Since April 2011, the station has broadcast an urban contemporary music format branded as "The Touch 107.7" to South-Central Mississippi.

History
WAZA was also the call letters of an AM station in the 1970s in Bainbridge, Georgia.

After applying in July 1996, this station received its original construction permit from the Federal Communications Commission on January 22, 1998. The new station was assigned the WAZA call sign by the FCC on February 20, 1998. WAZA received its license to cover from the FCC on September 25, 1998.

On September 21, 2011, Charles W. Dowdy, acting as the sole owner of license holder Southwest Broadcasting, Inc., dissolved the corporation and assigned the broadcast licenses it held (WAZA plus sister stations WAKH, WAKK, WAPF, WFCG, WJSH, WKJN, and WTGG) to himself acting as debtor in possession before initiating a Chapter 11 bankruptcy. The FCC approved the license transfer on December 19, 2011.

On October 25, 2019, the stations emerged and this signal was transferred to North Shore Broadcasting.

References

External links

AZA
Urban contemporary radio stations in the United States
Radio stations established in 1998
Amite County, Mississippi